Keong Sim is an American actor. He portrayed Dr. Sung Park in the TNT medical drama Monday Mornings and Pastor Wayne in the Netflix series Dead to Me. He currently is living in Los Angeles.

Early life
Keong Sim was born in South Vietnam to South Korean parents, but moved to the United States when he was 4 years old.

Career
Keong is a comedy mentor of Laughter for a Change and has acted in numerous television, film and stage productions.

In addition to his skills as an improvisational theater actor and teacher, Keong has worked at The Public Theater in New York City, and the Steppenwolf Theater in his hometown, as well as around the globe, in places such as Canada, Cuba, England and the Czech Republic. Keong has worked extensively using improvisation techniques for corporate training seminars.

Filmography

Film

Television

Video games

References

External links 

21st-century American male actors
American people of Korean descent
American male actors of Korean descent
Living people
Year of birth missing (living people)